Ibrahim El-Baba is a Lebanese swimmer. He competed at the 1980 Summer Olympics and the 1984 Summer Olympics.

References

Year of birth missing (living people)
Living people
Lebanese male swimmers
Olympic swimmers of Lebanon
Swimmers at the 1980 Summer Olympics
Swimmers at the 1984 Summer Olympics
Place of birth missing (living people)